The People's Party of South Ossetia is a social liberal political party in South Ossetia, a partially recognized Caucasian republic, considered by most countries to be a part of Georgia. The party is led by Roland Lvovich Kelekhsayev.

External links
Official website (in Russian)

References

Political parties in South Ossetia
Social liberal parties